Kaspar Taimsoo (born 30 April 1987) is an Estonian rower. He is a four time Olympian and four time European champion. He is a member of Viljandi Rowing Club.

Rowing career

2004–2008
Taimsoo made his first international appearance in the Junior World Championships in 2004 achieving 14th position in the double sculls event. In 2005 he won a bronze medal in the single sculls event at the Junior World Championships. His first appearance at the World Rowing Championships was in 2007 in Munich, Germany where he competed in the quadruple sculls event with Allar Raja, Igor Kuzmin and Vladimir Latin finishing on 8th position. The same team achieved 5th place at the 2007 European Rowing Championships held in Poznań, Poland.

Taimsoo made his first appearance at the Olympic Games in Beijing 2008 competing in the quadruple sculls event with Raja, Kuzmin and Latin. The men were 4th in their preliminary heat and won the repechage. In the semifinals they finished fourth and did not get to Final A. Their final place was 9th as they finished third in Final B. The same team also won the Queen Mother Challenge Cup at the Henley Royal Regatta. In September 2008 Taimsoo won his first European Championships medal, a silver, in the double sculls event with Vladimir Latin.

2009–2012
In 2009 Taimsoo won his first World Championships medal, a bronze, competing in the double sculls event with Allar Raja in Poznań. The same duo also won the gold medal at the 2009 European Rowing Championships, held in Brest, Belarus. Raja and Taimsoo finished 8th at the 2010 World Rowing Championships held at Lake Karapiro, New Zealand. The same crew finished second at the 2010 European Championships. Taimsoo and Raja finished 7th at the 2011 World Rowing Championships. For the 2011 European Championships Taimsoo and Raja formed a new quad scull team with Tõnu Endrekson and Andrei Jämsä. The crew finished second after Russia and won the silver medals.

At the 2012 Summer Olympics, held in London, Taimsoo made his second olympic appearance in the quadruple sculls event. This time with Raja, Endrekson and Jämsä. The crew finished second in their preliminary heat and also in the semifinal, thus earning a place in Final A. In the final they finished just outside the medals in 4th place behind crews from Germany, Croatia and Australia, respectively. The same quadruple sculls crew won a gold medal at the 2012 European Championships.

2013–2016
The 2013 season started off with a good result as Taimsoo and Raja won a silver medal at the World Cup event held in Sydney, Australia. The 2013 European Championships, held in Seville, Spain was a disappointment as the men did not reach Final A and finished in 7th place overall.

In the summer of 2013 Taimsoo and Raja formed a new quadruple scull crew with young prospects Sten-Erik Anderson and Kaur Kuslap. The new crew had an immediate success winning bronze medals at the World Cup events held at Eaton and Lucerne. They also finished 5th at the 2013 World Rowing Championships held at Tangeum Lake, Chungju in South Korea. The same team repeated their 5th place at the 2014 World Rowing Championships held in Amsterdam.

In the summer of 2015 Taimsoo and Raja reunited with Tõnu Endrekson and Andrei Jämsä in preparation for the 2016 Olympic Games. The crew went on to win a bronze medal at the 2015 World Rowing Championships held in France. In the spring of 2016 they also won a gold medal at the 2016 European Championships. At the 2016 Summer Olympics, held in Rio de Janeiro, Taimsoo made his third olympic appearance in the quadruple sculls event, with Raja, Endrekson and Jämsä. The crew won their preliminary heat, thus earning a place in Final A. In the final they finished third winning the bronze medals, behind crews from Germany and Australia, respectively.

Achievements
Olympic Games Medals: 1 Bronze
World Championship Medals: 3 Bronze
European Championship Medals: 3 Gold, 3 Silver, 1 Bronze
Junior World Championship Medals: 1 Bronze

Olympic Games
2008 – 9th, Quadruple sculls (with Allar Raja, Igor Kuzmin, Vladimir Latin)
2012 – 4th, Quadruple sculls (with Allar Raja, Tõnu Endrekson, Andrei Jämsä)
2016 – Bronze , Quadruple sculls (with Allar Raja, Tõnu Endrekson, Andrei Jämsä)

World Rowing Championships
2007 – 8th, Quadruple sculls (with Allar Raja, Igor Kuzmin, Vladimir Latin)
2009 – Bronze , Double sculls (with Allar Raja)
2010 – 8th, Double sculls (with Allar Raja)
2011 – 7th, Double sculls (with Allar Raja)
2013 – 5th, Quadruple sculls (with Allar Raja, Sten-Erik Anderson, Kaur Kuslap)
2014 – 5th, Quadruple sculls (with Allar Raja, Sten-Erik Anderson, Kaur Kuslap)
2015 – Bronze , Quadruple sculls (with Allar Raja, Tõnu Endrekson, Andrei Jämsä)
2017 – Bronze , Quadruple sculls (with Allar Raja, Tõnu Endrekson, Kaur Kuslap)
2019 – 12th, Quadruple sculls (with Allar Raja, Tõnu Endrekson, Kaur Kuslap)

European Rowing Championships
2007 – 5th, Quadruple sculls (with Allar Raja, Igor Kuzmin, Vladimir Latin)
2008 – Silver , Double sculls (with Vladimir Latin)
2009 – Gold , Double sculls (with Allar Raja)
2010 – Silver , Double sculls (with Allar Raja)
2011 – Silver , Quadruple sculls (with Allar Raja, Tõnu Endrekson, Andrei Jämsä)
2012 – Gold , Quadruple sculls (with Allar Raja, Tõnu Endrekson, Andrei Jämsä)
2013 – 7th, Double sculls (with Allar Raja)
2014 – 6th, Quadruple sculls (with Allar Raja, Sten-Erik Anderson, Kaur Kuslap)
2015 – 8th, Quadruple sculls (with Allar Raja, Sten-Erik Anderson, Tõnu Endrekson)
2016 – Gold , Quadruple sculls (with Allar Raja, Tõnu Endrekson, Andrei Jämsä)
2017 – 7th, Quadruple sculls (with Allar Raja, Sten-Erik Anderson, Kaur Kuslap)
2018 – 9th, Quadruple sculls (with Allar Raja, Sten-Erik Anderson, Kaur Kuslap)
2019 – 8th, Quadruple sculls (with Tõnu Endrekson, Sten-Erik Anderson, Jüri-Mikk Udam)
2020 – 4th, Quadruple sculls (with Allar Raja, Tõnu Endrekson, Jüri-Mikk Udam)
2021 – Bronze , Quadruple sculls (with Allar Raja, Tõnu Endrekson, Jüri-Mikk Udam)

Junior World Rowing Championships
2004 – 14th, Double sculls (with Alo Kuslap)
2005 – Bronze , Single sculls

Henley Royal Regatta
2008 – Queen Mother Challenge Cup

Rowing World Cup

References

External links

Biography and results  at worldrowing.com

1987 births
Living people
Sportspeople from Viljandi
Estonian male rowers
Olympic rowers of Estonia
Rowers at the 2008 Summer Olympics
Rowers at the 2012 Summer Olympics
Rowers at the 2016 Summer Olympics
Rowers at the 2020 Summer Olympics
World Rowing Championships medalists for Estonia
Medalists at the 2016 Summer Olympics
Olympic medalists in rowing
Olympic bronze medalists for Estonia
Recipients of the Order of the White Star, 3rd Class